The Pit River Bridge (officially the Veterans of Foreign Wars Memorial Bridge) is a double deck, deck truss, road and rail bridge over Shasta Lake in Shasta County, California. The bridge, carrying Interstate 5 on its upper deck and Union Pacific Railroad on its lower deck, was built in 1942 as part of the construction of the Shasta Dam/Shasta Lake reservoir system. The Pit River Bridge was constructed to replace the Lower Pit River Bridge, as the rising waters of the Shasta Lake reservoir would have put the older bridge underwater. The bridge is Interstate 5's halfway point. 

At the time it was built, the highway on the bridge was signed as U.S. Route 99 and the rail line was owned by Southern Pacific. The Coast Starlight, the passenger train line operated by Amtrak that runs between Los Angeles and Seattle, also uses the bridge.

The bridge is officially known as the Veterans of Foreign Wars Memorial Bridge, to honor military veterans from California who have fought in foreign wars.

The Pit River Bridge was the subject of the 1954 Pulitzer Prize for Photography winner entitled "Rescue on Pit River Bridge", taken by Virginia Schau.

See also

References

Road bridges in California
Road-rail bridges in the United States
Railroad bridges in California
Buildings and structures in Shasta County, California
Bridges on the Interstate Highway System
Interstate 5
Pit River
Union Pacific Railroad bridges
Bridges completed in 1942
Warren truss bridges in the United States
1942 establishments in California